Carrowdore is a small village on the Ards Peninsula in County Down, Northern Ireland. It is situated in the townland of Ballyrawer, the civil parish of Donaghadee and the historic barony of Ards Lower. It lies within the Ards and North Down Borough. It had a population of 960 people in the 2011 Census.

Education 
Strangford Integrated College in Carrowdore educates approx. 740 pupils. There is also a primary school, Carrowdore Primary School, which educates approx. 150 pupils. In the grounds of the primary school is a 'playgroup' nursery, which hosts approx. 30-40 young children.

People
Louis MacNeice, the poet, is buried at the Church of Ireland church, Carrowdore. He died on 4 September 1963, in London and is buried beside his mother (who died of TB when he was a child) and his grandfather.

Other

Carrowdore was once renowned for the former Carrowdore 100 motorcycle Road Race which was started in 1927. It consisted of a 5½ mile road circuit which started on the Greyabbey to Millisle Road and continued down the coast road. After World War II, the Tourist Trophy race moved to Dundrod, but after a couple of years the race moved back to Carrowdore, with the start in the village and the course running to just outside Greyabbey and back to Carrowdore. The last race to be held at Carrowdore was in 2000, but it unfortunately resulted in the death of popular Tandragee rider Eddie Sinton. The race course also hosts many cycling races on a regular basis.

Population

2011 Census
In the 2011 Census Carrowdore had a population of 960 people (382 households).

2001 Census
Carrowdore is classified as a Small Village by the Northern Ireland Statistics and Research Agency (NISRA) (i.e. with population between 500 and 1,000 people). On Census day (29 April 2001) there were 816 people living in Carrowdore. Of these:
24.3% were aged under 16 years and 15.3% were aged 60 and over
48.9% of the population were male and 51.1% were female
2.1% were from a Catholic background and 93.0% were from a Protestant background
3.6% of people aged 16–74 were unemployed

References 

Poets' Graves
Culture Northern Ireland

See also 
List of towns and villages in Northern Ireland
May Crommelin

Villages in County Down
Civil parish of Donaghadee